The Benin Cup is the top knockout tournament of the Beninese football. It was created in 1974.

Winners
1974 : Etoile Sportive Porto-Novo
No Cup between 1975 and 1977      
1978 : Requins de l'Atlantique FC (Cotonou)
1979 : Buffles du Borgou (Parakou)
1980 : no Cup
1981 : Requins de l'Atlantique FC (Cotonou)
1982 : Buffles du Borgou (Parakou) 2-1 Université Nationale du Bénin FC
1983 : Requins de l'Atlantique FC (Cotonou)
1984 : Dragons de l'Ouémé (Porto Novo)
1985 : Dragons de l'Ouémé (Porto Novo)
1986 : Dragons de l'Ouémé (Porto Novo)
1987 : no Cup
1988 : Requins de l'Atlantique FC (Cotonou)
1989 : Requins de l'Atlantique FC (Cotonou) 3-0 ASMAP
1990 : Dragons de l'Ouémé (Porto Novo)
1991 : Mogas 90 FC (Porto Novo)
1992 : Mogas 90 FC (Porto Novo) 1-1 Dragons de l'Ouémé      [5-4 pen]
1993 : Locomotive Cotonou 0-0 Postel Sport               [4-3 pen]
1994 : Mogas 90 FC (Porto Novo)
1995 : Mogas 90 FC (Porto Novo) 2-1 Toffa Cotonou 
1996 : Université Nationale du Bénin FC (Porto Novo) 1-0 Requins de l'Atlantique FC (Cotonou)
1997 : Energie FC (Cotonou) 0-0 Entente Force Armée [9-8 pen]
1998 : Mogas 90 FC (Porto Novo) 1-0 Dragons de l'Ouémé
1999 : Mogas 90 FC (Porto Novo)
2000 : Mogas 90 FC (Porto Novo) 1-0 Buffles du Borgou (Parakou)
2001 : Buffles du Borgou (Parakou) 1-0 Dragons de l'Ouémé (Porto Novo)
2002 : Jeunesse Sportive Pobé 0-0 1-1 Mogas 90 FC (Porto Novo) [4-3 pen]
2003 : Mogas 90 FC (Porto Novo) 1-0 (a.p.) Soleil FC
2004 : Mogas 90 FC (Porto Novo) 1-0 Requins de l'Atlantique FC(Cotonou)
2005 : unknown winner
2006 : Dragons de l'Ouémé (Porto Novo)        0-0 2-0 Mogas 90 FC (Porto Novo)
2007 : Université Nationale du Bénin FC (Porto Novo) 2-0 Association Sportive Oussou Saka (Porto-Novo)
2008 : ASPAC FC (Cotonou)                        1-0 Dadjè FC
2009 : not known if played
2010 : not known if played
2011 : Dragons de l'Ouémé (Porto Novo) 2-1 Association Sportive Oussou Saka (Porto-Novo)
2012 : Mogas 90 FC (Porto Novo) 3-0 Dragons de l'Ouémé
2013 : not played (Coupe de l'Indépendance played by regional sides)
2014 : AS Police 2-2 (4-3 pen.) Ayema FC

Number of Wins

References

External links
Benin - List of Cup Winners, RSSSF.com

Football competitions in Benin
National association football cups
Recurring sporting events established in 1974
1974 establishments in Africa